Cicho is the fourth studio album by the pop rock singer Ewa Farna, released on 9 March 2009. It is a Polish version of her album Ticho, which has originally Czech lyrics and charted at #2 on the Czech album chart.

Track list

External links
 [ Cicho] at AllMusic

Ewa Farna albums
2009 albums
Polish-language albums